"Nathy Peluso: Bzrp Music Sessions, Vol. 36" (also known as "Nasty Girl") is a song recorded by Argentine producer Bizarrap and Argentine-Spanish singer Nathy Peluso belonging to his section of Bzrp Music Sessions. Released on November 27, 2020 through Dale Play Records, it achieved instant social media virality in Hispanic countries for its catchy lyrics. Commercialy, the song reached number 4 on the Billboard Argentina Hot 100 chart and peaked at 121 on the Global 200, among others. The track was nominated in two Premios Gardel categories, Song of the Year and Best Urban/Trap Song, winning the latter one. It was later featured in the soundtrack for season four of hit Spanish Netflix show Elite as its main song.

Background
Bizarrap announced the Music Sessions through a video preview that he published on his social media. Later Nathy Peluso shared that same video on her Instagram.

Personnel
Credits adapted from Genius.

 Nathy Peluso – vocals
 Bizarrap – producer
 Evlay – mixing
 Javier Fracchia – mastering
 ElTiin14 – artwork
 Lautaro Furiolo – videographer

In popular culture
The song was included in the official soundtrack of the 4th season of the Spanish Netflix series Élite. The song had an appearance on the Argentine television show Bailando 2021. It was referenced in Tiago Pzk's song "BZRP Music Sessions #48".

Charts

Certifications

References

2020 songs
2020 singles
Bizarrap songs
Nathy Peluso songs
Argentine songs
Song recordings produced by Bizarrap